Newtown was a parliamentary electorate in Wellington, New Zealand from 1902 to 1908.

Population centres
The Representation Act 1900 had increased the membership of the House of Representatives from general electorates 70 to 76, and this was implemented through the 1902 electoral redistribution. In 1902, changes to the country quota affected the three-member electorates in the four main centres. The tolerance between electorates was increased to ±1,250 so that the Representation Commissions (since 1896, there had been separate commissions for the North and South Islands) could take greater account of communities of interest. These changes proved very disruptive to existing boundaries, and six electorates were established for the first time, including Newtown, and two electorates that previously existed were re-established.

The electorate was based on the inner city suburb of Newtown.

History
The electorate was represented by one Member of Parliament, William Henry Peter Barber.

The 1902 election was contested by Barber, Thomas William Hislop, Charles Luke, William Chapple and William George Tustin. They received 1385, 1357, 1100, 1017, and 159 votes, respectively. John Crewes had initially also contested the election, but he withdrew his nomination before polling day.

The 1905 election was contested by Barber, Thomas William Hislop, William Chapple and Alfred Hindmarsh. They received 3231, 2018, 1795, and 383 votes, respectively.

Members of Parliament
Newtown was represented by one Member of Parliament, William Barber.

Key

1905 election

References

Bibliography

Historical electorates of New Zealand
Politics of the Wellington Region
1902 establishments in New Zealand
1908 disestablishments in New Zealand